Monalanong Hill is a mountain often considered the highest point of Botswana, with an altitude derived from SRTM data of 1,494 metres (4,900 feet).

The Otse Hill (at a reported altitude of 1,491 metres - 4,891 feet) or the Tsodilo Hills (at an altitude of about 1,400 metres - 4,593 feet) are also often cited as the highest point in Botswana.

References 

 Elevation data supplied by the Shuttle Radar Topography Mission.

External links 
 Peakbagger listing

Mountains of Botswana